The 2015–16 Meistriliiga season was the 76th season of the Meistriliiga, the top level of ice hockey in Estonia, since the league's formation in 1934. The season started on 10 October 2015 and concluded on 19 March 2016. On 27 February 2016, Narva PSK won the title with three games to spare after a 5–1 home win over Kohtla-Järve Viru Sputnik. It was their first league title since 2001 and their 17th Estonian league title overall.

Teams

Results

League table

References

External links
 Official website

Estonia
2015 in Estonian sport
2016 in Estonian sport
Meistriliiga (ice hockey) seasons